The 2017 Utah Valley Wolverines volleyball team will  represent Utah Valley University in the 2017 NCAA Division I women's volleyball season. The Wolverines are led by nineteenth year head coach Sam Atoa and play their home games at Lockhart Arena. The Wolverines are members of the WAC.

Utah Valley comes off a season where they finished second in the WAC. For 2017 the Wolverines were picked to finish third in the pre-season WAC poll behind New Mexico State and UTRGV.

Season highlights
Season highlights will be filled in as the season progresses.

Roster

Schedule

 *-Indicates Conference Opponent
 y-Indicates NCAA Playoffs
 Times listed are Mountain Time Zone.

Announcers for televised games
All home games will be on the WAC Digital Network. Select road games will also be televised or streamed.

Fresno State: No commentary
Southern Utah: No commentary
Kansas: Matthew Baiamonte & Kyle Bruderer
Montana: Matthew Baiamonte & Kyle Bruderer
Long Beach State: Matthew Baiamonte & Kyle Bruderer
Idaho State: Cade Vance & Matt Steuart 
Utah State: Daniel Hansen & Meagan Nelson
TCU: Jeff Williams
Weber State: Kylee Young
Utah: Matthew Baiamonte & Kyle Bruderer
BYU: Matthew Baiamonte & Kyle Bruderer
Seattle: No commentary
Grand Canyon: Alex Larson & JP Sar
CSU Bakersfield: Randy Rosenbloom
UTRGV: Matthew Baiamonte & Kyle Bruderer
New Mexico State: Matthew Baiamonte & Kyle Bruderer
Chicago State: No commentary
Kansas City: TJ Jackson
Seattle: Matthew Baiamonte & Kyle Bruderer
CSU Bakersfield: Matthew Baiamonte & Kyle Bruderer
Grand Canyon: Matthew Baiamonte & Kyle Bruderer
New Mexico State: 
UTRGV: 
Kansas City: Matthew Baiamonte & Kyle Bruderer
Chicago State: Matthew Baiamonte & Kyle Bruderer

References

2017 team
2017 in sports in Utah
Utah Valley